Georgina Bruni (born Linda Naylor; 12 January 1947 – 19 January 2008) was a British businesswoman and a UFO researcher best known for her book on the Rendlesham Forest incident, You Can't Tell the People. She worked as a celebrity events organizer and as the founder and editor in chief of the online magazine Hot Gossip.

Biography
Born Linda Naylor, Bruni trained as a private investigator and subsequently became an investigative journalist in the 1980s. She specialized in the researching and reporting on cults and the paranormal. According to an obituary by fellow UFO researcher Nick Pope, she travelled extensively and at various times lived in Jersey, Italy, Hong Kong and America, before settling in London in 1992." She died from ovarian cancer on 19 January 2008. Obituary for Georgina Bruni , twinbases.org.uk; accessed 7 March 2016.</ref>

You Can't Tell the People
Bruni wrote one book called You Can't Tell the People, a study of Britain's most famous UFO case, the Rendlesham Forest incident of December 1980. It was published in hardback by Sidgwick & Jackson in November 2000, and in paperback by Pan Macmillan in November 2001. The title comes from a quotation Bruni claims to have been spoken by Margaret Thatcher, Prime Minister at the time of the events in 1980: "UFOs! You must get your facts right and you can't tell the people".

The hardback edition was launched at media event held at the Ministry of Defence, alongside fellow UFO researcher Nick Pope.

Post-publication
After its publication, she worked with Admiral of the Fleet Lord Peter Hill-Norton, who asked questions in the House of Lords regarding the case.

References

1947 births
2008 deaths
English journalists
Ufologists
Deaths from cancer in England
People from Knightsbridge